Alophosoma syngenes is a moth of the family Noctuidae first described by Turner in 1929. It is found in Australia.

References

Catocalinae
Moths of Australia